The 23rd congressional district of Ohio was eliminated as a result of the redistricting cycle after the 1980 Census. The district had been created after the elimination of Ohio's at-large congressional district after the 1950 election.

In its last decade, the district consisted of western and southern Cuyahoga county.

List of members representing the district

Election results

References

 Congressional Biographical Directory of the United States 1774–present

External links 
 1978 Maps of Ohio - Showing Congressional, Senatorial, Representatives, and Judicial Districts, Ted W. Brown, Secretary of State, and James Marsh, Assistant Secretary of State

23
Former congressional districts of the United States
1953 establishments in Ohio
1983 disestablishments in Ohio
Constituencies established in 1953
Constituencies disestablished in 1983